Tilt is an American punk rock band from the East Bay, California, United States, formed in 1992. The group's debut studio album, Play Cell, was released through Lookout Records in 1993. They would soon after get signed to Fat Wreck Chords, which the rest of its albums were released through. The band consisted of Cinder Block (vocals), Jeffrey Bischoff (guitar), Pete Rypins (bass), and Vincent Camacho (drums). Starting on February 15, 1994 at the Cattle Club in Sacramento and ending on April 6, 1994 in Vancouver, Tilt supported Green Day on their Dookie tour.

Tilt's song "Crying Jag" appears on the soundtrack for the film Glory Daze (1996). Tilt broke up for a short time in 1996 but reunited in 1997 with Jimi Cheetah of Screw 32. They were scheduled to play a one-night-only reunion show on May 13, 2011 at 924 Gilman Street in Berkeley, California but had to cancel because the bass player injured his arm needing surgery. The show was never rescheduled. However, Tilt played a one-off reunion show in the fall of 2015 as a part of a two-day festival to celebrate the 25th anniversary of Fat Wreck Chords. They played another reunion show on January 1, 2017 at 924 Gilman Street.

Cinder Block was also the lead singer for Retching Red, Fabulous Disaster, and The Pathogens.

Discography

Studio albums
 Play Cell (1993) Lookout Records
 'Til It Kills (1995) Fat Wreck Chords
 Collect 'Em All (1998) Fat Wreck Chords
 Viewers Like You (1999) Fat Wreck Chords

Compilation albums
 Been Where? Did What? (2001) Fat Wreck Chords

Extended plays
 Tilt (1992) Lookout Records
 Worse to Bad (1995) Munster Records
 Gun Play (1998) Fat Wreck Chords

Singles
 "Libel" (1995) Fat Wreck Chords
 "War Room" / "Animated Corpse" (1999) Fat Wreck Chords

Compilation and soundtrack appearances
 "Weave and Unravel" on Fat Music for Fat People (1994)
 "White Homes" on Angus: Music from the Motion Picture (1995)
 "Libel" on Fat Music Volume II: Survival of the Fattest (1996)
 "Crying Jag" and "Berkeley Pier" on Glory Daze (soundtrack) (1996)
 "Partial Birth" on Fat Music Volume III: Physical Fatness (1997)
 "Molly Coddled" on A Compilation of Warped Music (1998)
 "Old School Pig" on Fat Music Volume IV: Life in the Fat Lane (1999)
 "John for the Working Man" on Short Music for Short People (1999)
 "Bad Place" on Live Fat, Die Young (2001)
 "War Room" on Wrecktrospective (2009)
 "Crying Jag" on The Lookingouting! (2017)

References

External links
Bio at Fat Wreck Chords

Punk rock groups from California
Fat Wreck Chords artists
Musical groups from the San Francisco Bay Area
Musical groups established in 1992
Musical groups disestablished in 2001
Musical groups reestablished in 2015